The Idarado Mine was a mining operation in the San Juan Mountains of Ouray County, Colorado near the now-ghost town of Guston, producing primarily lead, silver and zinc along with lesser amounts of gold and copper.  The mine is within the Sneffels-Red Mountain-Telluride mining district.  The remains of the operation are visible from the Million Dollar Highway, north of Red Mountain Pass, between Ouray and Silverton, Colorado.  The tunnels of the Idarado extend some 5 miles (8 km) west under 13,000 foot (4,000 m) mountains to the Pandora Mill near Telluride, a trip of more than 60 miles (100 km) by highway.

The mine was a consolidation of several previously inactive mines interconnected via the Treasury Tunnel.  The Treasury Tunnel was initially created in 1896 with the hope of connecting older mine workings to allow for drainage and exploiting ore deposits thought to exist between the mines of Red Mountain and Telluride. The tunnel operated for about 10 years with limited success.  In 1939 several companies merged and secured the mining rights to many of the inactive mines on the west side of the Red Mountain Valley, utilizing the old Treasury Tunnel. Many of the interconnected mines had been some of the district's best producers before closing due to low metal prices and inability to pump the deep mines dry. The operation was named Idarado and in all,  some 80 miles of underground workings were created or connected.

The Idarado produced large amounts of lead, silver and zinc, with lesser amounts of gold and copper. During World War II, the Idarado was a large supplier of critically needed lead and zinc. The mine operated in limited capacity until 1979, when production stopped.  Eventually the concentration mill was removed and activity at the mine turned to reclamation.

During the 1980s, reclamation efforts took place at the mill-tailings ponds near the mine and farther north down the valley, near the old Ironton town site, where more mill tailings ponds had been created after all available space near the mine had been exhausted.  The old tailings ponds can still be seen just off the highway, appearing now as flat, grassy meadows.

References
Mindat.org: Minerals of the Idarado Mine — from Mindat.org.

External links

Gold mines in Colorado
Buildings and structures in Ouray County, Colorado
San Juan Mountains (Colorado)
Underground mines in the United States